Dixeia pigea, the ant-heap small white or ant-heap white, is a butterfly in the family Pieridae that is native to Africa.

Description
The wingspan is 40–48 mm for males and 40–52 mm for females. The upperside of the wings of males is pure white with a narrow black forewing tip and small black dots on the hindwing margin. The underside is whitish with two rows of black spots on the hindwings, with the inner row sometimes absent or incomplete. The female has several colour forms, but is usually pale yellowish white on the uppersurface with heavier black markings than the male, and has a dark spot on each forewing. There is a rare female form (luteola) where the upperside is orange yellow or deep apricot. The underside of females is similar to the male but the rows of black dots are more pronounced and the base colour is pale to bright yellow. Another rare form (rubrobasalis) has orange suffusion at the base of the underside of the forewing and a creamy-yellow upperside. The dry-season form (alba) has reduced black markings. A distinguishing feature of D. pigea is that the hindwing costal has a yellow streak, unlike other Dixeia species.

Distribution
This species is found from the Eastern Cape province of South Africa through KwaZulu-Natal, Eswatini, Mpumalanga and Limpopo Province, to Mozambique, Zimbabwe, Ethiopia, DRC, Angola and Cameroon.

Life cycle

Eggs
Groups of tiny, elongated eggs are laid on the undersurface of the leaves of the food plants.

Larvae
The larvae are green; pale green on the back and darker green on the sides when young, and develop two rows of pale green blotches down the length of the body as they grow older. The food plants are Capparis sepiaria and Capparis tomentosa.

Pupae
The pupae have an unusual shape, with a pointed 'nose' and a notable spike on each side of the body protruding from a broad, flattened area midway down the body. There is a smaller spike both to the fore and rear of each of these larger spikes, and a small spike on each side of the body just to the rear of the head. The larger spikes resemble to some extent the double, hooked thorns on the stems of the food plant, Capparis tomentosa (see image). The pupae may be pale green, dark green or brown in colour. The wing areas show whitish or yellowish with dark spots near to hatching and the body becomes greyish.

Adults
The flight period is all year. They have been described as having a medium-fast, random flight pattern or as a rather weak, slow flying butterfly. They keep to open areas in riverine forest and thick bush or the edges of bush areas. Both sexes feed from flowers and are greatly attracted to flowering bushes exposed to the sun.

Gallery

References

Seitz, A. Die Gross-Schmetterlinge der Erde 13: Die Afrikanischen Tagfalter. Plate XIII 14

Pierini
Butterflies of Africa
Butterflies described in 1836
Taxa named by Jean Baptiste Boisduval